Janiszów may refer to the following places in Poland:
Janiszów, Kamienna Góra County in Lower Silesian Voivodeship (south-west Poland)
Janiszów, Trzebnica County in Lower Silesian Voivodeship (south-west Poland)
Janiszów, Kraśnik County in Lublin Voivodeship (east Poland)
Janiszów, Opole Lubelskie County in Lublin Voivodeship (east Poland)